Macleod was a provincial electoral district in Alberta, Canada, mandated to return a single member to the Legislative Assembly of Alberta from 1905 to 1993.

History
The Macleod electoral district was one of the original 25 electoral districts contested in the 1905 Alberta general election upon Alberta joining Confederation in September 1905. The district was carried over from the territorial Macleod electoral district which returned a single member to the Legislative Assembly of the Northwest Territories from 1885 to 1905. Frederick W. A. G. Haultain the former Premier of the Northwest Territories until 1905 and incumbent in the Northwest Territories Macleod district chose contest the South Qu'Appelle electoral district for a seat in the Legislative Assembly of Saskatchewan. Malcolm McKenzie a lawyer who had lived in Fort Macleod and previously worked with Haultain was elected the first representative of the Macleod district.

The Macleod electoral district was abolished in the 1993 electoral district re-distribution when it was merged with Pincher Creek-Crowsnest to form the Pincher Creek-Macleod electoral district.

Members of the Legislative Assembly (MLAs)

Election results

1905 general election
The Returning Officer for the 1905 election was James Wilson.

1909 general election

1910 by-election

1913 general election

1917 general election

1921 general election

1926 general election

1930 general election

1935 general election

1940 general election

1944 general election

1948 general election

1952 general election

1955 general election

1959 general election

1963 general election

1967 general election

1971 general election

1975 general election

1979 general election

1982 general election

1986 general election

1989 general election

Plebiscite results

1957 liquor plebiscite

On October 30, 1957, a stand-alone plebiscite was held province wide in all 50 of the then current provincial electoral districts in Alberta. The government decided to consult Alberta voters to decide on liquor sales and mixed drinking after a divisive debate in the Legislature. The plebiscite was intended to deal with the growing demand for reforming antiquated liquor control laws.

The plebiscite was conducted in two parts. Question A, asked in all districts, asked the voters if the sale of liquor should be expanded in Alberta, while Question B, asked in a handful of districts within the corporate limits of Calgary and Edmonton, asked if men and women were allowed to drink together in establishments.

Province wide Question A of the plebiscite passed in 33 of the 50 districts while Question B passed in all five districts. Macleod voted against the proposal by a very slim margin. The voter turnout in the district was well above the province wide average of 46% with well over half the electors turning out to vote.

Official district returns were released to the public on December 31, 1957. The Social Credit government in power at the time did not consider the results binding. However the results of the vote led the government to repeal all existing liquor legislation and introduce an entirely new Liquor Act.

Municipal districts lying inside electoral districts that voted against the plebiscite such as Macleod were designated Local Option Zones by the Alberta Liquor Control Board and considered effective dry zones. Business owners that wanted a license had to petition for a binding municipal plebiscite in order to be granted a license.

See also
List of Alberta provincial electoral districts
Fort Macleod, a town in southwest Alberta

References

Further reading

External links
Elections Alberta
The Legislative Assembly of Alberta

Former provincial electoral districts of Alberta